Daphné Collignon (born 1977, Lyon) is a French comic book author.

Biography
Collignon continued with the two volumes of Cœlacanthes. In 2009, she collaborated with the reporter, Anne Nivat on the album, .

In 2010, Collignon participated in the series created by Frank Giroud: . Subsequently, she has collaborated regularly with scriptwriter . Collignon also illustrates children's books such as Badésirédudou, Mélodie des Iles, Trois Gouttes de Sang, Chaân, La Petite Maison dans la Prairie, La Guerre de l'Ours, Calpurnia, Camille Claudel, and Marie Curia. Collignon also taught at the École Émile-Cohl in Lyon. She participated in the collective album, Cher corps (2019), resulting from the work of YouTuber, .

Awards and recognition
 Prix Ballon rouge, 2004

Selected works

Bande dessinée 
 Le Rêve de Pierres, with Isabelle Dethan (scriptwriter),  "Équinoxe", 2004
 Cœlacanthes - Vol. 1 : Noa (scriptwriter, drawing, and coloring), Vents d'Ouest "Équinoxe", 2006
 Récits Ferroviaires (scriptwriter, drawing, and coloring), collectif, Éditions Ouest-France, 2006
 Cœlacanthes - Vol. 2 : Emma (scriptwriter, drawing, and coloring), Vents d'Ouest "Équinoxe", 2007
 Correspondante de guerre (scriptwriter, drawing, and coloring), with Anne Nivat (scriptwriter), Soleil Productions, 2009
 Marie Moinard and collective, En chemin elle rencontre... : Les artistes se mobilisent contre la violence faite aux femmes, /Amnesty International, September 2009 
 Destins - Vol. 2 : Le Fils (drawing and colors), with Virginie Greiner (scriptwriter), Glénat Editions "Grafica", 2010
 Sirène (scriptwriter, drawing, and coloring), Dupuis, 2013 
 Avant l'heure du tigre : La voie Malraux (drawing and coloring), with Virginie Greiner, Glénat, 2015 
 Flora et les Étoiles Filantes (adaptation, staging, drawing, and coloring) with Chantal Van Den Heuvel, Le Lombard, 2015
 Tamara de Lempicka (drawing and coloring), with Virginie Greiner (scriptwriter), Glénat, 2017
 Calpurnia, with Jacqueline Kelly (scriptwriter) (adaptation), 2018
 Cher corps, with Léa Bordier (scriptwriter), Delcourt, 2019 
 Calpurnia, Vol. 2, with Jacqueline Kelly (scriptwriter) (adaptation), Rue de Sèvres, 2020

As illustrator 
 Douze histoires de la Bible, by Geneviève Laurencin, Flammarion, 2001 
 Quinze histoires de la Bible, by Geneviève Laurencin, Flammarion, 2001 
 Izmir, by Patrick Vendamme, Flammarion "", 2002 
 L'Ane et le Lion, by Jean Muzi, Flammarion "Père Castor", 2002 
 Pas touche à mon copain, by Philippe Barbeau, Flammarion "Castor cadet", 2003 
 La Danse de Fiona, by Nathalie Somers,  "Premiers Romans", 2010
 Badésirédudou, by Marie-Claude Bérot, Flammarion "Père Castor", 2012 (illustrated reissue)
 Le B.A ba de la Savate - Boxe française, by Victor Sebastiao, Fleur de Ville Éditions, 2013
 Ma Vie de Chien, by France Quatromme, Fleur de Ville Éditions, 2014
 Sorcière des Brumes, by Lena Kaaberbol, Vol. 1, 2, and 3, Bayard "Jeunesse", 2016-17
 Calpurnia, Apprentie Vétérinaire (3 vol.), by Jacqueline Kelly, 2017-18
 Camille Claudel, by Bénédicte Solle-Bazaille, Bayard "Roman Doc Art", 2019

References

1977 births
Living people
Artists from Lyon
Writers from Lyon
French comics writers
French comics artists
French female comics artists
French illustrators
21st-century French women artists
21st-century French women writers